Abdelhakim Bouhna (born 24 May 1991) is a Belgian-born Moroccan footballer who plays as a winger.

Career 
Bouhna started his career at the third-tier Diegem Sport before he was spotted by Anderlecht scouts during a friendly between the two clubs and arranged a transfer in the summer of 2012. He never broke, however, into the Anderlecht first team, playing on loan at second-tier SV Roeselare and in Anderlecht's reserves. 

After a period as a free agent in late 2014, he signed with Serie B side Latina Calcio. Not finding much playing time, he left the club the following summer, signing for NK Istra 1961 in Croatia in September 2015. There, he made his first-team debut in the Prva HNL in the 1-0 away loss against NK Rijeka on 13 September 2015.

On 28 December 2017, Bouhna signed a one-and-a-half-year contract with Bulgarian club Lokomotiv Plovdiv.

Honours

Club
Lokomotiv Plovdiv
 Bulgarian Cup: 2018–19

References

External links

1991 births
Footballers from Brussels
Living people
Belgian footballers
Moroccan footballers
Belgian sportspeople of Moroccan descent
R.S.C. Anderlecht players
K.S.V. Roeselare players
Latina Calcio 1932 players
NK Istra 1961 players
PFC Lokomotiv Plovdiv players
Serie B players
Croatian Football League players
First Professional Football League (Bulgaria) players
Expatriate footballers in Italy
Moroccan expatriate sportspeople in Italy
Expatriate footballers in Croatia
Moroccan expatriate sportspeople in Croatia
Expatriate footballers in Bulgaria
Moroccan expatriate sportspeople in Bulgaria
Association football wingers
K. Diegem Sport players